Killy may refer to:

People 
 Edward Killy (1903–1981), American filmmaker
 Jean-Claude Killy (born 1943), French Olympic skier 
Jim Killy (born 1942), Hungarian-Canadian footballer 
 Walther Killy (1917–1985), German literary scholar, Der Killy
 Killy (rapper) (born 1997) Canadian hip-hop artist, song-writer and rapper

Character 
 Killy (Blame!), a character in the manga Blame!

Places 
 Killingworth, England
 Killingworth (disambiguation)
 Killie, a nickname for Kilmarnock, Scotland

Other 
 Another name for the pocket billiards game, Kelly pool